Chaubunagungamaug may refer to:

Lake Chaubunagungamaug, in Massachusetts
Chaubunagungamaug Reservation, near Webster, Massachusetts